Miguel Prat (born 19 November 1955) is a Spanish cross-country skier. He competed in the men's 15 kilometre event at the 1984 Winter Olympics.

References

1955 births
Living people
Spanish male cross-country skiers
Olympic cross-country skiers of Spain
Cross-country skiers at the 1984 Winter Olympics
Skiers from Catalonia
Sportspeople from Terrassa